Buxton is a town  north-east of Melbourne in the Australian state of Victoria. At the 2016 census, Buxton had a population of 233.

The district around Buxton was significantly impacted by the Black Saturday bushfires. It was isolated for several days with no telephone or power.

Today Buxton remains a small township with a roadhouse, a post office, general store, a fishing and outdoors store, Salmon and Trout Farm, hotel, a town hall, a primary school, nursery and several bed and breakfasts.

Facilities
Buxton has an active Country Fire Authority station with one medium and one light tanker. The Buxton Fire Brigade was formed in 1943 and officially recognised on 25 February 1944.

After the 2009 Black Saturday fires, the Marysville Police station was temporarily relocated in Buxton until the new station was opened in 2012.

The Igloo Roadhouse was established in 1946 and is famous for their burgers. The Buxton Post Office opened on 1 February 1873.

The Buxton Primary School opened in 1875 and had 13 students in 2018. The original school building was refurbished in 2011 and a new building was constructed in 2012. Another building was refurbished in 2015 for use as an environmental science classroom.

The closest secondary school is Healesville High School.

Population
In the 2016 Census, there were 233 people in Buxton. 77.5% of people were born in Australia and 89.8% of people spoke only English at home.

References

Towns in Victoria (Australia)
Shire of Murrindindi